The giant bandicoot (Peroryctes broadbenti) is a species of marsupial in the family Peramelidae endemic to Papua New Guinea. Its natural habitat is subtropical or tropical dry forests.

The type locality is Papua New Guinea, Central Prov., banks of Goldie River (a tributary of the Laloki River) inland from Port Moresby.

Of the 11 species of bandicoots on mainland Papua New Guinea, the giant bandicoot is the only bandicoot species that weighs more than 2kg. The giant bandicoot is more than twice the weight of other bandicoots and adult males of the species can attain weights well in excess of 4 kg.

References

Peramelemorphs
Endemic fauna of Papua New Guinea
Marsupials of New Guinea
Mammals of Papua New Guinea
Endangered fauna of Oceania
Taxa named by Edward Pierson Ramsay
Mammals described in 1879
Taxonomy articles created by Polbot